Radzovce is a village and municipality in the Lučenec District in the Banská Bystrica Region of Slovakia. The zip code of the village is 98558. The population nationality consist of 80% Hungarian and 20% Slovak.

External links
 
http://www.statistics.sk/mosmis/eng/run.html

Villages and municipalities in Lučenec District
Hungarian communities in Slovakia